Diary of a School Director is a 1975 Soviet drama film directed by Boris Frumin.

Plot 
The film tells about the school director, who oversees the daily life of the school, tries to understand the problems of education and conflicts with the head teacher of the school, who is also devoted to her work.

Cast 
 Oleg Borisov as Boris Sveshnikov
 Iya Savvina as Valentina Fyodorovna
 Alla Pokrovskaya as Lida
 Aleksandr Snykov as Sergey
 Lyudmila Gurchenko as Nina Sergeyevna
 Elena Solovey as Tatyana Georgiyevna
 Sergey Koshonin as Igor Koltsov
 Nikolay Lavrov as Oleg Pavlovich
 Georgiy Teykh as Genrikh Grigoryevich
 Yuriy Vizbor as Pavlik Smirnov

References

External links 
 

1975 films
1970s Russian-language films
Soviet drama films
1975 drama films